The Egyptian Will Party is an Egyptian political party made up of retired members of the Egyptian military.

References

2013 establishments in Egypt
Political parties established in 2013
Political parties in Egypt